Senawang is a suburb in Seremban, Negeri Sembilan, Malaysia. It is administered by the Seremban City Council.

It is at the south of Seremban neighbouring two districts, Rembau and Kuala Pilah.

Neighborhood

 Lavender Heights 
 Taman Bandar Senawang 
 Taman Matahari Height 
 Taman Seri Pagi
 Taman Teratai
 Taman Tasik Jaya
 Taman Kobena
 Taman Desa Dahlia 
 Taman Desa Ixora
 Taman Desa Flora
 Taman Senawang Indah
 Taman Nusa Intan
 Taman Alamanda
 Taman Cendana
 Taman Senawang Jaya
 Taman Cattleya
 Taman Sri Mawar
 Taman Lily
 Taman Perniagaan Senawang
 Angsi Ville
 Kasia Ville
 Taman Marida
 Taman Jasmin
 Taman Desa Melor
 Taman Desa Melor Indah
 Taman Rasa Sayang
 Taman Ros Mewah
 Taman Kiambang Indah
 Taman Satria

Economy

Senawang Light Industry Area
Sri Senawang Light Industries is an industrial area in Senawang, nearby Senawang Interchange. A notable electronic manufacturing company is onsemi, others were located in Tuanku Jaafar Light Industrial area Samsung SDS, and NXP Semiconductors. Other company in Senawang area included Seagate Systems (Malaysia) Sdn Bhd in New Senawang Industrial Area (Malay: Kawasan Perusahaan Senawang Baru).

Retail

Senawang Commercial Centre
Senawang Commercial Centre also known as Taipan Senawang or Dataran Senawang is the major retail centre in Senawang.
 
It includes Giant hypermarket and eateries such as McDonald's, KFC, Pizza Hut, Domino's Pizza and Secret Recipe.

Commercial banks includes Maybank, Bank Rakyat, Bank Simpanan Nasional, and RHB Bank.

Senawang City Centre
Senawang City Centre includes amenities such as Proton service centre, a Pos Malaysia (Pos Laju) centre and sports complex for futsal. It also includes major retail lots known as Taipan 2 Senawang which is the extension of Taipan Senawang located side by side to each other.

Commercial banks includes Bank Islam, Affin Bank  and SME Bank.

D'Cattleya Retail Centre

Bandar Prima Senawang
A relatively new retail centre, just adjacent to Senawang Commercial Centre. The centrepiece of Bandar Prima Senawang is a Mydin mall.

Local Cuisine
Many fast-food chains like McDonald's, KFC, Pizza Hut, Domino's Pizza and Secret Recipe are now the main attractions in Senawang. All were located in Senawang Commercial Park (well known as Taipan of Senawang).

Transportation

Senawang has connected interchanges with the North–South Expressway, Seremban–Port Dickson Highway, a highway that connects Seremban district and Port Dickson district, both are districts of Negeri Sembilan and Kajang–Seremban Highway, (Malay: Lebuhraya Kajang- Seremban), or LEKAS Highway that connects the states of Negeri Sembilan and Selangor.

KTM Komuter has extended commuter service to Senawang. The  extension commuter services is from Seremban to Senawang and Sungai Gadut, Negeri Sembilan.  Completed in 2011, it was part of the Seremban-Gemas line.

Indian company IRCON International Limited was awarded the project to build and upgrade the 98 km stretch between Seremban and Gemas. The project had been divided into two phases – Seremban–Sg Gadut (11.3 km) and Sg Gadut–Gemas (86.8 km).

Senawang is also served by Senawang and Sungai Gadut stations on the KTM Komuter Seremban Line.

Education

There are 8 national schools in Senawang consist of 5 primary schools and 3 secondary schools. Primary schools in Senawang are:

 SK Senawang
 SK Lavender Heights
 SK Senawang 3
 SK Sri Mawar
 SK Seri Pagi

Secondary Schools in Senawang are:

 SMK Senawang
 SMK Seri Pagi
 SMK Taman Forest Height

Also, there are two private Islamic schools in Senawang:

 Sekolah Rendah Islam As-Saadiyah
 Sekolah Tinggi Islam As-Sofa

While there are plenty of kindergartens and tuition ran by the locals.

Health

The two major health care centre in Senawang is a government-owned Klinik Kesihatan Senawang at Persiaran Senawang  and a private owned SALAM Senawang Specialist Hospital at Lavender Heights Business Centre

SALAM Senawang provides specialized medical and healthcare services, accessible, affordable and acceptable to all in Senawang and its surrounding areas. A 105 - bed hospital, offering a comprehensive range of medical, surgical and consultative services, it also has a 24-hours emergency facility that enables it to attend to the surrounding urgent medical needs outside of the official hours for the Senawang residents.

Another is a private maternity hospital, Hospital Bersalin Sukhilmi at Taman Bandar Senawang

See also
Seremban

References

Towns in Negeri Sembilan